Mfoundi is a department of Centre Province in Cameroon.

The department covers an area of 297 km and as of 2005 had a total population of 1,881,876.  The department forms the Yaoundé capital and greater area.

See also
Yaoundé (in French)

References

Departments of Cameroon
Centre Region (Cameroon)